Clément Koretzky (born October 30, 1990 in Miramas) is a French former professional cyclist.

Major results

2008
 2nd Junior race, National Cyclo-cross Championships
2011
 1st GP Christian Fenioux
 1st Grand Prix de Bras
 1st Stage 2 Vuelta a la Comunidad de Madrid U23
 1st Stage 1 Giro della Valle d'Aosta
 1st Stage 3 Tour du Pays Roannais
2012
 1st Étoile d'or
 2nd Grand Prix de la Somme
 7th Grand Prix de Plumelec-Morbihan
2013
 5th Overall Tour du Gévaudan Languedoc-Roussillon
 5th Val d'Ille Classic
2014
 1st  Mountains classification Étoile de Bessèges
 4th Route Adélie
 6th Ronde van Drenthe
2015
 1st  Mountains classification Boucles de la Mayenne
 5th Tour de Berne
 9th Horizon Park Race for Peace
2016
 7th Overall Tour du Loir-et-Cher

References

External links

1990 births
Living people
French male cyclists
Sportspeople from Bouches-du-Rhône
Cyclists from Provence-Alpes-Côte d'Azur